Armstrong is an unincorporated community in Middlefork Township, Vermilion County, Illinois.

History
Armstrong was laid out in 1876 on land owned by Thomas and Henry Armstrong; it was on the route of the Havana, Rantoul, and Eastern narrow-gauge railroad (which later became the Illinois Central Railroad).

On October 2, 1908, a fire destroyed many important buildings in Armstrong, including the general store, the harness shop, the blacksmith shop, the lumber yard, the opera house, the post office, and the grain elevator. Water was pumped by hand by residents to try to fight the fire, and water was also brought by rail from over a mile away; the town had no fire equipment.

Geography
Armstrong is located in the northwestern part of the county, just northeast of the intersection of U.S. Route 136 and Illinois State Route 49. It is about four miles west of Potomac.

References

External links
NACo

Unincorporated communities in Vermilion County, Illinois
Unincorporated communities in Illinois
Populated places established in 1876
1876 establishments in Illinois